is a railway station in Moriyama-ku, Nagoya, Aichi Prefecture,  Japan, operated by Meitetsu.

Lines

Station layout
The station has two opposed side platforms, capable of handling trains of up to six carriages in length.. The station has automated ticket machines, Manaca automated turnstiles and is unattended..

Platforms

Adjacent stations

|-
!colspan=5|Nagoya Railroad

Station history
Obata Station was opened on April 2, 1905, on the privately operated Seto Electric Railway.   The Seto Electric Railway was absorbed into the Meitetsu group on September 1, 1939. A new station building was completed in 1999-2000.

Passenger statistics
In fiscal 2017, the station was used by an average of 6650 passengers daily.

Surrounding area
Moriyama Ward Office
 Moriyama Junior High School

See also
 List of Railway Stations in Japan

References

External links

 Official web page 

Railway stations in Japan opened in 1905
Railway stations in Aichi Prefecture
Stations of Nagoya Railroad
Railway stations in Nagoya